Shannon Purser (born June 27, 1997) is an American actress. She made her acting debut as Barb in the Netflix drama series Stranger Things (2016–2017), for which she was nominated for the Primetime Emmy Award for Outstanding Guest Actress in a Drama Series.

Purser made her film debut in the supernatural horror film Wish Upon (2017), and starred in the romantic comedy Sierra Burgess Is a Loser (2018). She also portrays the recurring role of Ethel Muggs in the CW teen drama series Riverdale (2017–present).

Early life
Purser was born on June 27, 1997, in Atlanta, Georgia. In 2016, Purser was attending Kennesaw State University. She formerly worked at a movie theater in her hometown of Roswell, Georgia, but quit in order to focus on acting.

Career
Purser made her acting debut in the Netflix science fiction drama series Stranger Things. She portrayed the character Barbara Holland, an intelligent and outspoken girl, who is the best friend of Nancy Wheeler (Natalia Dyer). Despite her only being a minor character, several outlets called Barb one of their favorite characters. This role brought Purser to international fame, and earned her a nomination for the Primetime Emmy Award for Outstanding Guest Actress in a Drama Series.

Purser portrays Ethel Muggs in The CW's teen drama series Riverdale. In 2018, she played the titular role in the film Sierra Burgess Is a Loser. She had a minor role in the comedy film Life of the Party, which ended up being cut. Purser played Annabelle Bowman, a member of the drama troupe at Stanton High, in the drama Rise, and read the audiobook of Leah on the Offbeat.

Personal life
Purser is an amateur visual artist and musician. She has spoken about living with OCD, and regularly advocates for mental health and anxiety-awareness. On April 18, 2017, Purser came out as bisexual in a Twitter post.

Filmography

Film

Television

Awards and nominations

References

External links
 

1997 births
American film actresses
American television actresses
Bisexual actresses
American bisexual actors
LGBT people from Georgia (U.S. state)
Living people
Actresses from Atlanta
21st-century American women